The Music of the Spheres World Tour is the ongoing eighth concert tour currently being undertaken by British rock band Coldplay. It was announced on 14 October 2021 in support of their ninth studio album, Music of the Spheres, and marked a return to live performing after the COVID-19 pandemic. The band had not toured for their previous record, Everyday Life (2019), putting shows on hold until they could work out how to ensure it would be environmentally friendly. According to a plan they developed for over two years, emissions are meant to be reduced by 50% compared to A Head Full of Dreams Tour (2016–17). 

Similar to the Mylo Xyloto Tour (2011–12),  the concert run features extensive use of pyrotechnic and confetti visuals. However, they were adapted to reduce carbon footprint: the former has less explosive charge and uses new formulas to reduce harmful chemicals, while the latter is 100% biodegradable and require less compressed gas for ignition. Meanwhile, Xylobands were replaced by PixMob wristbands made from plant-based materials. Other efforts include the first ever mobile rechargeable show battery (developed with BMW) and a mobile application to interact with fans and help them to take environmentally conscious travel options.

Coldplay also partnered with One Tree Planted, ClientEarth, the Grantham Institute and numerous other organizations to ensure their endeavour's success. Additionally, the band pledged to plant a tree for every ticket sold through a reforestation agreement. They broke various records in Latin America and Europe as sales began, moving over a million tickets in both continents. The tour started in Costa Rica's Estadio Nacional on 18 March 2022 and was met with widespread acclaim from music critics, who praised their stage presence and joyful performance, concluding the shows were "triumphant", "immersive" and "intimate".

Development

Background
After releasing their eighth album Everyday Life (2019), Coldplay stated they would not be touring until they could ensure their concert runs are environmentally friendly, which led the record to be promoted with small shows for charity and a special performance at the Amman Citadel in Jordan, broadcast by YouTube. On 14 October 2021, a day before the release of Music of the Spheres, the band posted on social media they would be returning to live shows after the COVID-19 pandemic. The announcement was accompanied by a detailed 12 steps plan, which was developed for two years with environmental experts and set out how Coldplay would reduce carbon dioxide emissions by 50% compared to A Head Full of Dreams Tour. To celebrate the album's release, they inaugurated the Climate Pledge Arena on 22 October 2021. The concert was broadcast by Amazon Prime Video and followed by a performance at Expo 2020's Programme for People and Planet, while the tour began in Costa Rica due to the country's renewable-energy-sourced power grid.

Sustainability

A team of sustainability experts was commissioned to investigate Coldplay's carbon footprint and study how to reduce it. Along with BMW, the band also developed the first ever mobile rechargeable show battery, which was made from recyclable BMW i3 batteries and powered concerts by using renewable resources such as hydrotreated vegetable oil, solar power and kinetic energy. Unavoidable emissions were offset according to Oxford's principles. They claimed a tree would be planted for every ticket sold through a global reforestation agreement with One Tree Planted as well. For transportation, the tour was routed to reduce air travel, band members mostly used commercial flights, a surcharge to utilize Sustainable Aviation Fuel from Neste was paid whenever possible and ground freight was done with electric vehicles or biofuel. The stage was built using lightweight, re-usable materials (such as recycled steel) and upgraded to incorporate low-energy LED displays, lasers and lighting set-ups, along with a PA system that consumed 50% less power, thus reducing environmental noise outside the venues. Additionally, they used wind-turbine technology on delay towers and solar blankets on unused seats.

For special effects, Coldplay used biodegradable confetti adapted to require less compressed gas for ignition, while pyrotechnics had new formulas to reduce or eliminate harmful chemicals and mitigate the explosive charge. The PixMob wristbands worn by the audience were made from 100% plant-based materials and the band pledged to decrease their production by collecting, sterilising and recharging them after every show. To minimize food waste, they had crew catering menus that offered plant-based and meat-free options as the standard, sourced products from suppliers adept to regenerative agriculture techniques, supported the development of synthetic, lab-grown cultured meals, donated surplus to local food banks and composted organic waste such as vegetable peelings and scraps. The band also worked with venues to establish recycling programs, replace single-use water bottles with alternatives such as the Ball aluminium cups, include refill stations, introduce aerated taps, lower flushing toilets and reduce water pressure.

Fans and accessibility
Coldplay partnered with SAP to develop a free mobile application for the tour which calculated the total carbon footprint generated by concert goers and encouraged them to take environmentally friendly travel options. Fans who committed to the effort were given a discount code on their merchandise store. Partners and vendors were carefully selected to provide high quality products made from natural fibres and re-usable elements, which were then packaged in recycled paper, card or compostable bags. Additionally, the band incorporated kinetic floors and stationary bicycles in venues to power the C-stage and further interact with attendees. They provided bass-delivering vests from SubPac and two sign language interpreters for concert goers with hearing loss as well, while guests who are blind or have low vision were offered a designated platform and touch tours before each show. In May 2022, the band announced Infinity Tickets, a limited set of $20 admissions for fans who could not afford standard prices.

Partnerships
In May 2022, The Times revealed Coldplay donated over £2.1 million to environmental causes through J Van Mars Foundation during the previous year. Aside from teaming up with One Tree Planted, the band continued their partnership with ClientEarth, to which they have been patrons since 2011. Support to the Ocean Cleanup was declared as well, as they sponsored two watercrafts to collect plastic from polluted rivers before it reaches the sea in Malaysia. Other organizations endorsed by Coldplay include Global Citizen, The Food Forest Project, Sea Shepherd UK, Project Seagrass, Seafields, My Trees Trust, Farm Under the Radar, Project Quercus, Sustainable Food Trust, Global Tech Advocates, Knowledge Pele, Climeworks, Cleaner Seas Group, Conservation Collective and the Devon Environment Foundation, which have all assisted them to reach the tour's goal. Additionally, Imperial College London's Grantham Institute helped the band to study and publish their progress. In July 2022, DHL announced they would become Coldplay's freight partner due to the company's extensive "expertise and investment in sustainable logistics" and transport solutions.

Opening acts

American singer H.E.R. was the band's most frequent supporting act throughout the tour, opening for them in all dates from Costa Rica (with Mish Catt), Dominican Republic (with La Marimba), and Argentina (with Zoe Gotusso). In the first North American leg, she paired with a different act for each city: Leila Pari (Dallas), Alaina Castillo (Houston), Kacy Hill (Glendale), Bobby Gonz (Santa Clara), Drama (Chicago), Shaed (Landover), Bea Miller (East Rutherford), Lizzy McAlpine (Philadelphia), Mariah the Scientist (Atlanta) and Gigi (Tampa). For the second run in the region, however, she will be accompanied by 070 Shake in all concerts. H.E.R. also guested at select European dates in 2022, being replaced by London Grammar when not available. They partnered with Alli Neumann in Germany; Mery Spolsky in Poland; Gaumar in France; Lous and the Yakuza in France and Belgium; and Nina Nesbitt in Scotland. Meanwhile, the performances at Wembley Stadium saw Griff, Ibibio Sound Machine and Laura Mvula as the second openers.

Mexico was the only country where the shows were exclusively supported by national acts: Carla Morrison said she "cried for the entire day" when the contract was settled and felt more excited than when she won her Latin Grammy Awards. Meanwhile, DannyLux affirmed the experience was "somewhat of a crazy dream" and he felt nervous about the public at first, as "they just see this random kid opening up with a different style of music", but the attendees responded well. In September 2022, Camila Cabello guested in Peru (with Andrea Martinez), Colombia (with Mabiland) and Chile (with Princesa Alba). H.E.R. was originally going to support Coldplay once again for the concerts in Brazil, but she was replaced by Chvrches after the former band postponed the tour because of Martin's severe lung infection. They will be accompanied by Elana Dara in São Paulo, while duo Clara x Sofia take over in Curitiba and Rio de Janeiro.

Commercial performance
Pitchfork named the Music of the Spheres World Tour one of the most anticipated concert runs of 2022. Sales for the European leg were opened on 22 October 2021 and Coldplay sold over a million tickets throughout the day in the region according to Billboard. Due to high demand, they added a fifth and a sixth date at Wembley Stadium. Four days later, extra shows were announced at King Baudouin Stadium and Stade de France, with Fnac reporting the band sold over 200,000 tickets in record time at the latter venue. General sales for Argentina opened on 9 December 2021 and they added three performances at Estadio River Plate in the following hours to support the demand, which included selling over 200,000 tickets in less than 17 hours. On the next day, media outlets reported all shows were officially sold out. Coldplay later scheduled six more dates at the venue and they also sold out. On 22 August 2022, it was reported four million admissions were bought around the world.

According to Manchester Evening News, over 400,000 people attempted to purchase tickets for their shows at Etihad Stadium. Similarly, more than 312,000 buyers were waiting at Principality Stadium's virtual line. The extremely high demand from both venues caused the British Ticketmaster website to crash. Coldplay later announced additional performances for both places. Sales at Estadi Olímpic Lluís Companys were the fastest in Spain's history. A presale held during the previous day saw 80,000 customers trying to enter the Spanish Ticketmaster website at the same time, leading to another crash. Over 700,000 people attempted to buy admissions for the Johan Cruyff Arena shows. In total, 1.4 million tickets were sold in 24 hours for the second European run.

In December 2022, Billboard attested that despite reporting data from only 40 out of 64 shows performed, Coldplay had the most successful tour of the year by a group. When missing numbers were published, it was revealed the Music of the Spheres World Tour was actually the biggest concert run of 2022 overall, earning $342.1 million from 3.8 million tickets. The band also earned the highest-grossing tour of Latin America's history ($127.8 million from 1.6 million admissions) and surpassed $1.4 billion in career gross. On 23 January 2023, a second North American run was announced and IQ commented global ticket sales had already surpassed the six million mark.

Critical reception

North America
The tour was met with widespread acclaim from music critics. Andrew Chamings from the San Francisco Chronicle affirmed despite his "cynicism, Coldplay's show was a joyous, bright, cathartic post-pandemic triumph". Writing for Houston Press, Marco Torres said the concert "felt like a beautiful dream, with balloons flying around, confetti bursting from air cannons and lasers shooting from the stage through the smoke" as the band played their hits, concluding it was one of the best live music performances he had ever experienced. Similarly, Mac Engel from Fort Worth Star-Telegram commented "Martin showed all of the skills that make him one of the top pop performers of his generation" by making Cotton Bowl "feel intimate with a powerful set".

NJ.com Katie Kausch stated the MetLife Stadium shows were "pure fun" and the special effects were not really necessary, given how the songs "are good enough to stand on their own", but "confetti and fireworks are fun, so why not use them?". In a review for Chicago Sun-Times, Selena Fragassi wrote the band's "powerful mix of art and science set the bar for what arena tours of the future could – and should – look like". Christopher A. Daniel from The Atlanta Journal-Constitution affirmed their melodic songs and ability to please a crowd will sustain them as a "must-see legendary act". Writing for Tampa Bay Times, Carly Thompson praised Coldplay's stage presence and said the band "delivered what many seem to be looking for these days: an experience".

Europe
Regioactive Torsten Reitz said they were "full of energy and much more powerful than on record" in Frankfurt, mastering both "driving, pulsating beats" and "quiet moments" while proving "why they rightly belong to the biggest live bands of today". Writing for Virgin Radio about their Stade de France performances, Marine Pineau praised the band's sense of showmanship and stated they "lived up to [their] reputation" as a live act by "offering one of the most beautiful concerts of the year" while also "changing the rules of the game" with their sustainability efforts. In his five-star review for The Guardian, Alexis Petridis commented the tour's Wembley Stadium run was "a genuinely immersive experience", adding its namesake album gained depth with Coldplay's inventive approach. Kate Solomon from The Times called it a "triumphant homecoming", as the band are "tight and lithe all at once" with "guitars slaloming around Martin's thundering piano and keening falsetto", rating the performances with 4/5 stars. The Telegraph Neil McCormick affirmed they are "modern masters of stadium entertainment", with their ability "to transmit joy through the power of song" being "the most special effect of all". Similarly, Hannah Mylrea wrote in her five-star review for NME that Coldplay managed to offer a "masterclass in how a massive pop show can be done" while maintaining things "intimate and political".

Rock in Rio
Felipe Branco Cruz from Veja stated the band "reinvented the concept of arena rock" with their performance at Rock in Rio festival, turning fans into the show's protagonists instead of mere spectators and consequently carrying on the legacy of spectacles "which transcend music" that was established by groups such as Pink Floyd, Queen and U2. Writing for UOL, Yolanda Reis commented it is undeniable they are "true showmen", adding the night was "unique and unforgettable". Folha de São Paulo Carlos Albuquerque affirmed Coldplay exhibited "nearly two hours of delicious escapism" and effortlessly took advantage of everything at their disposal on stage. Ana Raquel Lelles praised them for keeping the audience excited with a "masterful" repertory despite the heavy rain in her review for Estado de Minas. Meanwhile, Julio Maria from Estadão said the band are in a "higher level of spectacle", highlighting the song "Paradise" as "the first great catharsis" in a curve which "continued to climb" throughout the concert.

Latin America
Writing for El Comercio, Juan Carlos Fangacio Arakaki mentioned Coldplay were "impeccable" and succeeded in delivering a complete and diverse set list in a show which "never let down". CNN Chile's Pablo Figueroa stated the band showcased "confidence, strength and respect for their audience" and were "protagonists in one of the most emotional musical moments" of the country since the transition to democracy. Marcelo Fernández Bitar from Clarín said the secret behind their demand is Martin's charisma, his bandmates' solidity and how they established a connection with the public, concluding the performance reaffirmed the passion evoked by the band's songs. Similarly, an editorial published by Infobae praised Coldplay for being "versatile" and "synchronized" in a concert that ranged "from the most subtle to the most grand". In his review for La Nación, Mauro Apicella commented they are in the "vanguard of stadium technology" and have songs that "became classics". Omelete Caio Coletti affirmed Guy Berryman's bass is "irresistibly propulsive", Martin's uncoordinated dancing "at this point is already a trademark" and Will Champion proved to be a good backing vocalist by guiding the "Viva la Vida" chants. He also lauded the band for giving a highly sensorial performance and understanding that "the night of the show is all about entertaining fans and finding new ways to elevate their experience".

Venue records

Accolades
Brazilian news outlets Folha de São Paulo, G1, O Globo, and UOL have all ranked Coldplay's performance among the best of Rock in Rio's 2022 edition. Billboard additionally named the stage's inflatable spheres technology one of the best concert special effects of the year.

Live broadcast and film
In September 2022, the band announced they would be launching a global broadcast of their 28 October show at Estadio River Plate in partnership with Trafalgar Releasing, which was responsible for premiering Coldplay: A Head Full of Dreams in 2018. The footage was directed by Paul Dugdale and repeat screenings were made available on the following day, becoming the first ever worldwide event to be transmitted from Latin America. Boxoffice Pro reported the concert was held in cinemas from 81 countries, the most in history for a live theatrical release. It also grossed $8.4 million worldwide, ranking at number one in the box office charts of Argentina, Chile, Mexico and the Netherlands; number two in Brazil; number three in the United Kingdom; number six in Italy; and number 10 in Australia. If non-movies were included, the broadcast would have reached number nine in the United States. In March 2023, Coldplay announced Live at River Plate, the transmission's definitive director's cut, featuring remixed and remastered sound, a behind-the-scenes short film with band interviews, and guest appearances from H.E.R. and Jin from BTS. Screenings are going to be held on 19 and 23 April, with ScreenX, 4DX and 4DX Screen versions being available in addition to standard cinema formatting.

Impact

According to Le Soir, the band proposed an "ecological plan that is unprecedented" in stadium tour levels. Similarly, Impact credited Coldplay with "redefining the rulebook" for eco-friendly touring, as their concert run "put environmental issues and climate change at the helm of international music news". Live Nation's sustainability director Lucy August-Perna commented their ideas helped to further build on the framework the company had been developing during the previous five years, adding she is "working with Coldplay to adopt their plans" and "standardize what they learn and best practices to provide sustainable touring options" for more people. Vogue Scandinavia affirmed the concert run "sets the bar for how every artist, and fans, can contribute to reducing their CO2 emissions", given its "transparency on the reality that no tour will be carbon negative in 2022", while also putting "efforts into creating the most sustainable show on the market", which "speaks louder than words". Uproxx and Billboard have noticed the band's impact on Billie Eilish's Happier Than Ever, The World Tour and Shawn Mendes' Wonder: The World Tour, respectively.

On the other hand, a spokesperson for the European Federation for Transport and Environment criticized their collaboration with Neste, claiming the company was "cynically using Coldplay to greenwash its reputation" and the partnership should be discontinued. Eoin Dubsky from SumOfUs additionally condemned the association with BMW. The band published a statement on their official website on the same day, reiterating that "When we announced this tour, we said that we would try our best to make it as sustainable and low carbon-impact as possible, but that it would be a work in progress. That remains true. We don't claim to have got it all right yet". Coldplay also mentioned BMW were the ones to offer help after contacting various electric car manufacturers to supply rechargeable batteries, adding they have "no connection to or influence on their corporate policies". Neste separately reported extensive investigations were conducted regarding their palm oil suppliers allegedly being linked to deforestation, but no evidence to support said violations were found, concluding "conventional palm oil or other virgin vegetable oils were not used as raw materials" for the aviation biofuels supplied to the band. 

Coldplay's work with John Wiseman (from Worldwide Sales) and Frederic Opsomer (from PRG Projects) for the stage's LED elements resulted in completely new products, such as inflatable three-dimensional orbs which "dramatically" reduced the necessary space to store and transport regular models. Opsomer also stated the custom technology developed for the tour will become "commonplace in a few years" in the live entertainment industry and that Coldplay were "valuable partners in the process", as they "took the chance and had the vision" for it. The band's long stay in Mexico led various memes to go viral on social media; they consisted of Coldplay members taking part in the country's everyday life. All shows held in Berlin caused microearthquakes during "A Sky Full of Stars", with the highest magnitude (1.5) being registered on 12 July 2022. Songs from their discography had a resurgence on streaming platforms as well, consequently reaching new peaks on Billboard Global 200. The government of Argentina created a US dollar exchange rate for live events which became known as the "Coldplay dollar", due to the band's record-breaking run at Estadio River Plate.

Set list
This set list was taken from the band's 3 July 2022 concert in Frankfurt, Germany. It does not represent all shows throughout the tour.

Act 1 – Planets
"Flying" 
"Music of the Spheres" 
"Higher Power"
"Adventure of a Lifetime"
"Paradise"
"Charlie Brown"
"The Scientist" 

Act 2 – Moons
"Viva la Vida"
"Hymn for the Weekend"
"Let Somebody Go"
"Politik"
"In My Place"
"Yellow"
"Sunrise" 

Act 3 – Stars
"Human Heart"
"People of the Pride"
"Clocks"
"Infinity Sign" 
"Something Just Like This" 
"Midnight" 
"My Universe"
"A Sky Full of Stars"

Act 4 – Home
"Sparks"
"Magic"
"Humankind"
"Fix You" 
"Biutyful"
"A Wave"

Tour dates

Cancelled shows

Personnel
Credits taken from the band's official tour book, which was released "in loving memory of Ben Farrey and Steve Strange".

Performing members
 Chris Martin – lead vocals, piano, rhythm guitar
 Jonny Buckland – lead guitar, backing vocals, keyboards
 Guy Berryman – bass, backing vocals, keyboards, percussion
 Will Champion – drums, backing vocals, percussion

Creative team
 Misty Buckley – co-creative director, production designer
 Richard Olivieri – art director
 Holly Molcher – assistant art director, design drafter
 Gloria Lamb – props, scenic art director
 Grant Draper – creative project manager
 Sooner Routhier – lighting designer
 David Kennedy – SFX designer
 Leo Flint – video designer
 Dan Trenchard – video programmer
 Joe Lott – main rig lighting programmer
 Matthew Kemp – PixMob lighting programmer
 Luke Davies – video design assistant
 Debs Wild – web ambassador

Security
 David White – FoH security
 Adrian Murphy – security

Backline
 Matt McGinn – guitar tech
 Craig Hope – guitar tech
 Laurie Jenkins – drum tech, crew chief
 Paul Newman – bass tech
 Dan Roe – backing track tech
 Eric Harris – keyboard tech, digital tech
 Matt Tagliaferro – guitar tech
 Neil Cole – piano tech

Wristbands
 Sophie Blondeau – executive producer
 Jacques Vanier – technical director
 Samantha Torres – lead pixel manager
 Garrett Fleming – pixel manager
 Mathieu Dumont – technician

Video crew
 Lisa Baker
 Gorgon Davies
 Drew Welker
 Manan Patel
 Hamanshu Patel
 Thomas Kozmiuk
 Eoin McBrien
 Anna Sadler
 Michaël Cordier
 Steven Lemahieu
 Kristian Maunder
 Marteen Deschacht

Video content produced by
 Studio Flint
 Fray Studio
 North House
 Luke Halls Studio
 Victor Scorrano
 Impossible Brief
 Hello Charlie
 Pilar Zeta
 Conner Griffith
 Mixed Emotions London

Catering
 Heather Spooner (chief)
 Sarah Goggin
 Sally Cureton
 Jacob May
 Ross Brown
 Pippa O'Driscoll
 Sam Letteri
 Sammie Argyle
 Ellie Butler
 Sam Smith
 Kylie Morris
 Ian Harris

Global Citizen
 Sarah Cotterell – crew chief, advance lead, volunteer manager
 Brother Don – Love Button, Global Citizen partner
 Garrick Dawson – Love Button, Global Citizen partner
 Luke Mescher – Global Citizen activation

Band party
 Dave Holmes – manager
 Phil Harvey – creative director
 Arlene Moon – day-to-day manager
 Mandi Frost – day-to-day manager
 Marguerite Nguyen – tour manager
 Orla Clarke – assistant tour manager
 Andy Frost – road manager, head of security
 Kim-Maree Penn – band security
 Dan Green – audio producer
 Rik Simpson – broadcast producer
 Bill Rahko – pro tools director
 Chris Salmon – digital director
 Sam Seager – head of visual content
 Luke Howell – sustainability officer
 Lauren Evans – physiotherapist
 Valeska Voiges – band chef
 Emma Jane Randall – band assistant
 Jessie Collins – band assistant
 Lauren Rauch – management coordinator
 Bertie Knutzen – band tour assistant
 Claire Finbow – band assistant
 Aziyn Babayan – Dave Holmes assistant
 Jen Milkis – Phil Harvey assistant, creative coordination

Audio
 Chris Wood – monitor engineer
 Tony Smith – audio director
 Nick Davis – monitor tech
 Ali Viles – RF tech
 James Smallwood – audio tech
 Nick Mooney – audio crew chief
 Matt Latham – studio tech

Audio crew
 Alex Hadjigeorgiou
 Tim Grant
 Dom Thorne
 Don Parks
 Suzy Mucciarone
 Simon Hall
 Georgios Mavreas
 Joe Simmons
 Nathan Tse

Communications
 Turner Pollari – communications chief
 Andy Dudash – communications tech, A2
 Dalton McGuire – radios, IT

Live Nation touring
 Ciaran Flaherty – US and South America representative
 Andrew Craig – UK and Europe representative
 Joya Cleveland – tour accountant
 Ariel Bojeun – sustainability

VIP Nation
 US – Lau Johannsen, Madison Lyle, David Albarran
 Europe – Ellie Alfonso, Jenn Russell

Apprentices
 Aliyah Stewart
 Kayla Erhardt

Merchandise
 Sarah Fries – merchandise director
 Ken Macalpine – merchandise manager
 Chris Varvaro – US merchandise manager
 Paul Nolan – UK and Europe merchandise manager

Promoters
 Live Nation
 SJM Concerts

Design and art direction
 Pilar Zeta, Victor Scorrano, Coldplay – original album artwork
 James Marcus Haney, Stevie Rae Gibbs – tour book photography
 Chris Salmon – tour book words
 RabbitHole – tour book design

Production
 Jake Berry – production director
 Russell Glen – technical manager
 Paul Traynor – stage manager
 Sean Robinson – stage manager
 Carmen Rodriguez – production coordinator
 Eme Boucher – production assistant
 Spencer Churchill – financial logistics
 Courtney Eusebio – tour accountant
 Poppy Ogilvy – band tour assistant
 Nichole Garcia – VIP ticketing
 Arman Chaparyan – head of special projects
 Minh Nguyen – utilities
 Haley Binder – CCO
 Stevie Rae Gibbs – band videography and photography
 Nicolette Santino – puppeteer for Angel Moon
 Nicole Lawrence – pedal steel guitar

Wardrobe and backstage
 Tiffany Henry – dressing rooms, grooming and wardrobe
 Fabio Borreani – dressing rooms assistant
 Tracy On – band chief assistant
 Beth Fenton – clothing director and stylist

Lighting
 Shaheem Litchmore – lighting director
 Fraser Mackeen – FoH tech, operator
 Daric Bassan – lighting crew chief
 Rhodri Morris – crew
 Nico Grigolato – crew

Special effects crew
 Michael Barrett-Bourmier (chief)
 Ashley Neal (operations)
 Alan Grant
 Brien Carpenter
 Eric Martinez
 Victor Negron
 Stefanie Müller
 Cassy Goldbeck
 Olly Yates
 Thornsten Stein
 Mike Hartle

Rigging crew
 Bjorn Melchert (lead rigger)
 Bjorn Steegen (barricade, ramps)
 Juul Goovaerts (barricade, ramps)
 Mark Kohorn
 Jonny Ackles
 George Werner

Automation
 Adan Maldonado

Carpenter crew
 Flory Turner (chief)
 Bryan Humphries
 Corey Settle
 Andrew Pearson
 Andy Turner
 Jan Legowski
 Steven Carlsen
 Pat Boyd

Power crew
 Mick McGillion (chief)
 Mark Rennocks
 Neil Whybrow
 David Lesh
 Laurie Paul
 James Hardy
 Todd Miklos (US only)

Sustainability
 Tim Benson – battery system, bikes
 Courtney Dodd – battery system, bikes
 Shariff Lovett – battery system, bikes
 Edwin Van Eekhout – energy floors
 Tim Jansen – energy floors

Gear
Credits taken from Projection, Lights & Staging News, with product quantities being represented between parenthesis whenever possible.

Lighting
 MA Lighting grandMA3 Full Size Console (2)
 MA Lighting grandMA3 Light Console (1)
 MA Lighting Network Processing Units (10)
 ACME Pixel Line IP Strobe (38)
 ACME Thunderbolt (48)
 Astera AX3 with Domes (80)
 Ayrton Domino Profile S (66)
 Ayrton Perseo Profile S (74)
 Chauvet Professional Strike M (192)
 Chauvet Professional Well Panel (12)
 Claypaky Xtylos Aqua (74)
 Robe BMFL FollowSpot (2)
 Robe BMFL FollowSpot LT (12)
 Robe RoboSpot Base Stations (7)

Video
 Moonrise Arch: ROE Visual CB8 LED Panels
 I-Mag Circles: ROE Visual CB8 LED Panels
 Spheres: PRG 25mm LED Inflatable Spheres
 Media Servers: Disguise GX 2C

Special Effects
 FireOne Firing System (1)
 X-Laser 36W Triton Unit (8)
 X-Laser 10W Triton Audience Scanning Unit (8)
 Arctos 120W Trident (1)
 Arctos 15W Coral Series Unit (12)
 Explo X2 Wave Flamer (8)
 MagicFX Stadiumblaster Confetti Cannon (16)
 MagicFX Stadiumshot Confetti Cannon (31)
 Master FX Mystic Haze Machine (12)
 HazeBase Base Tour Haze Machine (6)
 TubeHaze Setup (6)

Truss
 Tyler Truss 10' Custom HUD Truss Arch (14)
 Tyler Truss 10' HUD Truss (8)
 Tyler Truss 5' HUD Truss (26)
 Tyler Truss HUD Truss Corners (32)
 Custom Lighting Ladders (16)

See also
 List of Coldplay live performances
 List of highest-grossing concert tours
 List of highest-grossing live music artists

Notes

References

External links

Coldplay Official Website

2022 concert tours
2023 concert tours
Climate change in music
Coldplay concert tours
Concert tours of Belgium
Concert tours of Canada
Concert tours of Denmark
Concert tours of Europe
Concert tours of France
Concert tours of Germany
Concert tours of Italy
Concert tours of Mexico
Concert tours of North America
Concert tours of Portugal
Concert tours of South America
Concert tours of Spain
Concert tours of Sweden
Concert tours of Switzerland
Concert tours of the Netherlands
Concert tours of the United Kingdom
Concert tours of the United States
Environmental mass media
Scheduled events
Sustainability